The Women competition at the 2019 World Sprint Speed Skating Championships was held on 23 and 24 February 2019.

Results

500 m
The race was started on 23 February at 15:00.

1000 m
The race was started on 23 February at 16:20.

500 m
The race was started on 24 February at 15:00.

1000 m
The race was started on 24 February at 16:55.

Overall standings
After all races.

References

Women